Tamanrasset is a district in Tamanrasset Province, Algeria. It was named after its capital, Tamanrasset, which is also the capital of the province. With 96,843 people, it is the most populated district in the province (however, the population density is low) and one of the largest districts in the country.

Municipalities
The district is further divided into 2 municipalities:
Tamanrasset
In Amguel

References

Districts of Tamanrasset Province